This is a list of commanders of the US 101st Airborne Division of the United States Army

 MG William C. Lee August-42 – February-44
 BG Don F. Pratt 6-February-44 – 14-March-44
 MG Maxwell D. Taylor March-44 – August-45
 BG Anthony C. McAuliffe 5-December-44 – 26-December-44
 BG William N. Gillmore August-45 – September-45
 BG Gerald St. C. Mickle September-45 – October-45
 BG Stuart Cutler October-45 – November-45
 MG William R. Schmidt July-48 – May-49
 MG Cornelius E. Ryan August-50 – May-51
 MG Ray E. Porter May-51 – May-53
 MG Paul DeWitt Adams May-53 – December-53
 MG Riley F. Ennis May-54 – October-55
 MG Frank S. Bowen October-55 – March-56
 MG Thomas L. Sherburne, Jr. May-56 – March-58
 MG William C. Westmoreland April-58 – June-60
 MG Ben Harrell June-60 – July-61
 MG C.W.G. Rich July-61 – February-63
 MG Harry H. Critz February-63 – March-64
 MG Beverly E. Powell March-64 – March-66
 MG Ben Sternberg March-66 – July-67
 MG Olinto M. Barsanti July-67 – July-68
 MG Melvin Zais July-68 – May-69
 MG John M. Wright May-69 – May-70
 MG John J. Hennessey May-70 – February-71
 MG Thomas M. Tarpley February-71 – April-72
 MG John H. Cushman April-72 – August-73
 MG Sidney Bryan Berry August-73 – July-74
 MG John W. McEnery August-74 – February-76
 MG John A. Wickham Jr. March-76 – March-78
 MG John N. Brandenburg March-78 – June-80
 MG Jack V. Mackmull June-80 – August-81
 MG Charles W. Bagnal August-81 – August-83
 MG James E. Thompson Jr. August-83 – June-85
 MG Burton D. Patrick June-85 – May-87
 MG Teddy G. Allen May-87 – August-89
 MG J. H. Binford Peay III August-89 – June-91
 MG John E. Miller June-91 - July-93
 MG John M. Keane July-93 – March-95
 MG William F. "Buck" Kernan November-96 – February-98
 MG Robert T. Clark February-98 – June-00
 MG Richard A. Cody June-00 – July-02
 MG David H. Petraeus July-02 – May-04
 MG Thomas R. Turner II May-04 – November-06
 MG Jeffrey J. Schloesser November-06 – July-09
 MG John F. Campbell July-09 – August-11
 MG James C. McConville August-11 – June-14
 MG Gary J. Volesky June-14 – January-17
 MG Andrew P. Poppas January-17 – February-19 
 MG Brian E. Winski February-19 – March-21
 MG Joseph P. McGee March-21 – Present

References 

Lists of United States military unit commanders
United States Army officers
101st Airborne Division